Reindert Johannes "Jan" Brasser (20 November 1912, in Amsterdam – 30 August 1999, in Amsterdam) was a Dutch athlete who competed in the 1936 Summer Olympics.

References

External links

1912 births
1999 deaths
Dutch male discus throwers
Dutch male high jumpers
Olympic athletes of the Netherlands
Athletes (track and field) at the 1936 Summer Olympics
Athletes from Amsterdam